Saint-Germain-de-Calberte is a commune in the Lozère department in southern France.

The Scottish author Robert Louis Stevenson stayed at an inn in the village on the night of 1 October 1878, as recounted in his book Travels with a Donkey in the Cévennes:

The Robert Louis Stevenson Trail (GR 70), a popular long-distance path following Stevenson's approximate route, runs through the village.

See also
Communes of the Lozère department

References

External links
Saint Germain de Calberte in Lozere (separate texts in French, English, Dutch and German; photographs)

Saintgermaindecalberte